Ashes to Ashes is a South African telenovela that was written and developed by Genna Lewis and Rosa Keet. The show was eTV's first ever telenovela produced by Clive Morris Productions.

Synopsis
Ashes to Ashes follows the successful Namanes family and their Namane Funerals business. It revolves around the secrets and sacrifices of the family. Namane Funerals is run by Selogile Namane and his wife Mandlakazi and their children Tsietsi and Monwabisi. In season one the arrival of 'long lost' relative, Rebabedi, creates conflict.

Characters
Selo Namane (Patrick Shai)
Mandlakazi Namane (Nambitha Mpumlwana)
Tsietsi Namane (Nyaniso Dzedze)
Violet (Maggie Benedict)
Monwabisi Namane (Chumani Pan)
Rebabedi Namane (Zenande Mfenyana)
Mickey (Craig Urbani)
Damian (Mandla Gaduka)
Pinky (Khanyi Mbau)
Menzi Ngubane 
Tina Jaxa
Nat Ramabulana
Atandwa Kani
Siyabonga Melongisi Shibe
Magistrate (Mmabatho Mogomotsi)

Broadcast
The show Ashes to Ashes was first aired in South Africa in 2015 on E.tv with an initial run of 104 episodes. It aired Monday to Thursdays at 8:00 pm, and was later extended to play Monday To Friday. In 2016, Ashes to Ashes was renewed for a second season of 104 episodes. The show was not renewed for a third season. The final episode of Ashes To  Ashes was aired on 2 September 2016.

Ashes to Ashes was dubbed in French in 2017 and aired on three television channels, Afriqueplus+, Iroko+ and EASY TV RDC. In French, the show is known as L'Empire des Namane (The Empire of the Namanes).

Writers
Rosa Keet
Bongi Ndaba
Ruth Mo Moatlhodi
Linda Bere
Chisanga Kabinga
Lerato Khanye 
Mpumelelo Paul Grootboom
Tshego Monaisa
Gena Lewis
Nonzi Bogatsu
Fanyana Hlabangane
Maggie Benedict
Mammello Mokoena
Duduzile Mabaso
Salah Sabiti
Elsabé Roux
Cleo Moloi
Lehasa Moloi 
Sipho Xolisa Tshapu
Pusetso Thibedi
Tiro Makhudu
Makganwana Mokgolong.

Accolades
The South African Film and Television Awards (Saftas)

|-
| 2016
| Maggie Benedict
| Best Supporting Actress in Soap/Telenovela
| 
|-
| 2016
| Siyabonga Shibe| Best Supporting Actor-TV Soap/Telenovela
| 
|-
|-
| 2016
| Richard Lekunku'
| Best Actor-TV Soap/Telenovela
| 
|-
| 2017
| Mandla Gaduka
| Best Actor
| 
|-
| 2017
| Ashes to Ashes''
| Best TV Soap/Telenovela
|

References

External links
 

2010s South African television series